Semaphorin-4C is a protein that in humans is encoded by the SEMA4C gene.

Interactions 

SEMA4C has been shown to interact with DLG4.

References

Further reading